The Dyje–Svratka Valley is a geomorphological feature (a special type of vale) in South Moravian Region of the Czech Republic.

History
The Dyje–Svratka Valley has been a natural pass between the Vienna Basin (Carpathians) and the Vyškov Gate, the Upper Morava Valley, Moravian Gate and later, the North European Plain (Poland - Lower Silesia - Galicia) since ancient times. It served as an arm of several important trade routes from southern Europe to the Baltic Sea such as the Amber Road, as well as routes from Moravia to Upper Silesia and Lesser Poland.

The Emperor Ferdinand Northern Railway from Břeclav to Brno traverses the Dyje–Svratka Valley.

Geography
The floodplains of several rivers end in the Dyje–Svratka Valley, including Svratka, Jihlava, Svitava, Thaya, Jevišovka and Litava. Many towns are located within it, including the southern districts of Brno, Slavkov u Brna, Židlochovice, Pohořelice, Hrušovany nad Jevišovkou and Šlapanice.

The lowlands are poorly forested, mostly by riparian forest (oaks, populus and willows), with higher areas forested by false akacia (Robinia pseudoacacia). The lowlands are intensively farmed, with significant numbers of orchards (peaches, walnuts, apricots and almonds), vineyards and small woods. Only a few small sections are still covered by natural vegetation. The west valley contains numerous vineyards that are part of the wine making sub-regions of Mikulovská and Znojemská.

It is formed by the depression between the Carpathian Mountains in the east (Ždánice Forest, Kyjov Hills and Mikulov Highlands) and the Bohemian Massif in the west. Drainage runs into the river Morava, from there into the Danube basin and finally into the Black Sea.

It includes the low drainage divide Svratka-Dyje close to Mušov. Its soils mainly consist of chernozem and loess, local fluvisol and sand.

Transport
Highways that traverse the Dyje–Svratka Valley include D1 from Prague to Brno, D2 from Brno to Břeclav and Bratislava, and D52 from Brno to Vienna).

Gallery

See also
Vyškov Gate
Outer Subcarpathia
South-Moravian Carpathians
Lower Morava Valley

References

Further reading
Geografický místopisný slovník, Academia, Praha. (1993) 
Plašienka, D., Grecula, P., Putiš, M., Kováč, M., Hovorka, D. "Evolution and structure of the Western Carpathians: an overview."  in Grecula, P., Hovorka, D., Putiš, M. (Eds.) Geological evolution of the Western Carpathians. Mineralia Slovaca - Monograph, Košice (1997), pp. 1–24 

Valleys of the Czech Republic
Western Carpathians
Moravia